The Refrigerator Bowl was a college football bowl game played annually from 1948 until 1956 in Evansville, Indiana. The game was named for the local refrigerator production. With 3,800 units a day being manufactured, Evansville at the time was known as the "refrigerator capital of the United States".

Game results

References

Defunct college football bowls
Sports in Evansville, Indiana
1948 establishments in Indiana
1956 disestablishments in Indiana
Recurring sporting events established in 1948
Recurring sporting events disestablished in 1956